The Mass at Dordrecht is a painting by Aelbert Cuyp, completed circa 1650. It depicts ships in the river Maas in the city of Dordrecht, the Netherlands. The painting is done in the Dutch Golden Age style. It is currently held by the National Gallery of Art, in Washington, D.C.

Context
In July 1646, a large Dutch transport fleet carrying 30,000 soldiers gathered in Dordrecht. It was a show of force by the northern provinces who were fighting for independence from the Spanish crown in the Dutch Revolt.

References

Collections of the National Gallery of Art
Paintings by Aelbert Cuyp
1650 paintings
Ships in art